Just a couple is a British comedy-drama television miniseries created by Sebastian Thiel. Originally pitched by Upshot Entertainment in 2013, it was then further developed by Big Talk Productions in 2016.

The show explores the trials and tribulations of a millennial couple's relationship, through comedy. The series routes itself within the small details of what it's really like to be in a relationship. Episodes explore things like, the act of betraying your partner by finishing a Netflix series - when you promised to watch it together.

Just a Couple premiered on BBC Three on 9 March 2017. The show stars Frieda Thiel, Sebastian Thiel's younger sister, Michael Salami, Weruche Opia and Sean Sagar.

In 2018, Just a Couple won Favourite Comedy Production at the Screen Nation Awards and Debut Writer Award at The Debbies

Cast 
 Frieda Thiel as Shavon 
 Michael Salami as Mark 
 Weruche Opia as Melissa
 Sean Sagar as Daniel

References

External links 

 
 Just a Couple at British Comedy Guide
 Just a Couple on BBC iPlayer

BBC comedy-drama television shows
2017 British television series debuts
2017 British television series endings
Television series by Big Talk Productions